Richard Bolles may refer to:
 Richard Nelson Bolles (1927–2017), Episcopal clergyman and author
 Richard "Dicky" J. Bolles (1843–1917), Florida land salesman